Jonathan Fernando Castillo Aguirre (born 7 January 2001) is a Venezuelan footballer who plays as a winger for Venezuelan Primera División club Metropolitanos.

Club career

Metropolitanos
Born in Palo Verde, Castillo is a product of Metropolitanos. Ahead of the 2017 season, 16-year old Castillo was promoted to the first team squad. On 7 July 2017, Castillo signed his first professional contract with Metropolitanos. He got his official debut for the club in a Venezuelan Primera División game against Atlético Venezuela on 16 July 2017. Castillo made a total of two appearances in the 2017 season.

In February 2018, Castillo scored his first goal in the Venezuelan Primera División in a game against Mineros de Guayana. He made six appearances throughout the season. After a 2019 season with one goal in 13 games, Castillo signed a new contract until the end of 2021 in October 2019. In the following two season - 2020 and 2021 - Castille made a total of 22 appearances and scored one goal.

References

External links
 

Living people
2001 births
Association football wingers
Venezuelan footballers
Venezuelan Primera División players
Metropolitanos FC players
Footballers from Caracas